Bothrocophias is a genus of venomous snakes, pit vipers in the subfamily Crotalinae of the family Viperidae, known by the common name toadheaded pit vipers. The genus is endemic to northern South America.

Taxonomy
Bothrocophias is a relatively recently identified genus that consists of four to nine species, most of which were traditionally placed in Bothrops.

Oviparity
Recent evidence published by Campbell and Lamar (1989, 2004) suggests that Bothrocophias colombianus may lay eggs rather than give birth to live young. This would make it almost unique among New World pitvipers (but not Asian species). The only other American pitvipers known to lay eggs are the four species of bushmaster (Lachesis).

Species
The following nine  species are recognized as being valid.
Bothrocophias andianus  – Bolivia and Peru
Bothrocophias campbelli  – Ecuador
Bothrocophias colombianus  – Colombia
Bothrocophias hyoprora  – Ecuador, Colombia, Brazil, Peru, and Bolivia
Bothrocophias lojanus  – Ecuador, Peru
Bothrocophias microphthalmus  – Ecuador, Peru, Bolivia, Colombia and Brazil
Bothrocophias myersi  – Colombia
Bothrocophias myrringae  – Colombia
Bothrocophias tulitoi  – Colombia

Nota bene: A binomial authority in parentheses indicates that the species was originally described in a genus other than Bothrocophias.

References

Further reading
Campbell JA, Lamar WW (1989). The Venomous Reptiles of Latin America. Ithaca, New York: Comstock Publishing Associates. 440 pp. .
Gutberlet RL, Campbell JA (2001). "Generic Recognition for a Neglected Lineage of South Amnerican Pitvipers (Squamata: Viperidae: Crotalinae), with the Description of a New Species from the Colombian Chocó ". American Museum Novitates (3316): 1–15. (Bothrocophias, new genus, p. 4). (Bothrocophias myersi, new species, p. 7).

External links

 
Snake genera